Lukáš Šebek (born 10 October 1988 in Trenčín) is a Slovak football striker who currently plays for Nové Mesto.

References

External links

1988 births
Living people
Slovak footballers
Association football forwards
AS Trenčín players
Spartak Myjava players
Slovak Super Liga players
Sportspeople from Trenčín